Bavincourt is a commune in the Pas-de-Calais department in the Hauts-de-France region in northern France.

Geography
A farming village located 14 miles (22 km) southwest of Arras on the D8 road.

Population

Sights
 The church of St. Vaast, dating from the eighteenth century.
 A nineteenth-century chateau.
 A chapel.
 The war graves in the cemetery.

See also
Communes of the Pas-de-Calais department

References

External links

 The cemetery at Bavincourt

Communes of Pas-de-Calais